Herbert George Webb (1 July 1913 – 7 August 1947) was an English cricketer active in the mid-1930s. Born at Headington, Oxfordshire, Webb was a right-handed batsman who played as a wicket-keeper, playing the majority of his cricket in minor counties cricket, though he did make three appearances in first-class cricket.

Career
While studying at the University of Oxford, Webb made two first-class appearances for the university cricket club against HDG Leveson Gower's XI and Sussex in 1935, scoring a total of 72 runs in these matches, with a high score of 38. In that same season he also made his debut in minor counties cricket for Oxfordshire, with his debut coming against Bedfordshire in the Minor Counties Championship. He played minor counties cricket for Oxfordshire until 1937, making a total of 22 appearances. He made a third first-class appearance in 1936 when he was selected to play for a combined Minor Counties cricket team against Oxford University.

He died at St Albans, Hertfordshire on 7 August 1947.

References

External links
Herbert Webb at ESPNcricinfo
Herbert Webb at CricketArchive

1913 births
1947 deaths
Cricketers from Oxford
Alumni of St John's College, Oxford
English cricketers
Oxford University cricketers
Oxfordshire cricketers
Minor Counties cricketers
Wicket-keepers